The C&C 43-2 is a Canadian sailboat, that was designed by C&C Design as an International Offshore Rule racer and first built in 1980.

The design was marketed as the C&C 43, but is usually referred to as the 43-2 to differentiate it from the unrelated 1971 C&C 43-1 design.

Production
The design was built by C&C Yachts in Canada, but it is now out of production.

Design
The C&C 43-2 is a small recreational keelboat, built predominantly of fibreglass. It has a masthead sloop rig and an internally-mounted spade-type/transom-hung rudder. It displaces .

The boat is fitted with a Swedish Volvo Penta MD17 diesel engine.

The design has a PHRF racing average handicap of 72 with a high of 66 and low of 81.

See also
List of sailing boat types

Related development
C&C 43-1

Similar sailboats
Hunter 43 Legend
Hunter 420
Hunter 426
Hunter 430

References

Keelboats
1980s sailboat type designs
Sailing yachts
Sailboat type designs by C&C Design
Sailboat types built by C&C Yachts